Vikram David Amar (born February 15, 1963) is an American legal scholar focusing on constitutional law, federal courts, and civil and criminal procedure. In August 2015, he became dean of the University of Illinois College of Law and the Iwan Foundation Professor of Law. He was the first American-born person of Indian descent to serve as a dean of a major American law school.

Career 
Prior to his arrival at Illinois Law, Amar was professor and senior associate dean for academic affairs at the UC Davis School of Law (King Hall). Before becoming a professor, he clerked for Judge William Albert Norris of the U.S. Court of Appeals for the Ninth Circuit and for Justice Harry Blackmun at the U.S. Supreme Court (where he appears to be the first person of South Asian heritage to have clerked). After serving as a clerk, Amar worked in the Sacramento office of Gibson, Dunn & Crutcher, then began his career in legal academia in 1993 at King Hall. He joined the UC Hastings faculty in 1998, before returning to King Hall in 2007.

Amar received an A.B. in history from UC Berkeley. In 1988 he earned his J.D. from Yale Law School, serving as an articles editor for the Yale Law Journal.

He writes a biweekly column for justia.com. Previously, he wrote a regular column for FindLaw's Writ. He also frequently appears on national radio and television programs as a commentator on contemporary legal issues.

Amar is the younger brother of Yale University law professor Akhil Reed Amar. Vikram Amar was a student at Yale Law School at the time Akhil Amar started teaching there. The two have collaborated on cutting-edge and influential articles on many important topics, including the "Amar Plan" proposal for a National Popular Vote Interstate Compact, and the implausibility of the so-called "Independent State Legislature" notion.

See also
 Akhil Reed Amar
 Amar Plan
 List of law clerks of the Supreme Court of the United States (Seat 2)

References 

E.G., AMAR, VIKRAM DAVID, The Case for Reforming Presidential Elections by Subconstitutional Means: The Electoral College, the National Popular Vote Compact, and Congressional Power, 100 GEORGETOWN L.J. 237 (2011).  https://papers.ssrn.com/sol3/papers.cfm?abstract_id=1936374

AMAR, VIKRAM DAVID AND AMAR, AKHIL REED, Eradicating Bush-League Arguments Root and Branch: The Article II Independent-State-Legislature Notion and Related Rubbish, 2021 SUPREME COURT REVIEW 1 (2022). https://papers.ssrn.com/sol3/papers.cfm?abstract_id=3731755

External links

University of Illinois College of Law Faculty: Vikram David Amar
List of Amar's publications

University of Illinois Urbana-Champaign faculty
1960s births
Living people
American legal scholars
American lawyers
Law clerks of the Supreme Court of the United States
UC Berkeley College of Letters and Science alumni
UC Davis School of Law faculty
University of California, Hastings faculty
Yale Law School alumni
American academics of Indian descent
Deans of law schools in the United States
People associated with Gibson Dunn
Indian scholars